The 1912–13 Montreal Canadiens season was the team's fourth season and fourth of the National Hockey Association (NHA). The club would post a 9–11 record and tie for third place.

Regular season
Newsy Lalonde returned to Montreal after being acquired from Vancouver of the Pacific Coast League (PCHA). Don Smith was acquired from Victoria of the PCHA. Didier Pitre signed with Quebec but the league intervened and he returned to the Canadiens.

An exhibition game was played with the Wanderers in Toronto at the new Arena Gardens on December 22. Newsy Lalonde would trip Odie Cleghorn and his brother Sprague Cleghorn then skated over and hit Lalonde on the face, opening a 12 stitch cut. Cleghorn would be charged in Toronto court and fined $50 and suspended by the league.

The Canadiens would open the season with a three-game winning streak. At the halfway point, the club's record was 7–3 to lead the league, but Quebec came on strong with an eleven-game win streak to win the league championship and Montreal finished third behind Quebec and the Wanderers.

Final standings

Schedule and results

‡ Played with rover (7 man hockey)

Playoffs
The team did not qualify for the playoffs.

Awards and records

Milestones
 January 18, 1913 – Georges Vezina posted the club's first shutout.

References

Notes

See also
 1912–13 NHA season

Montreal Canadiens seasons
Montreal Canadiens season, 1912–13